Jonathan Quartey (born 2 June 1988 in Accra) is a Ghanaian footballer who plays for New Radiant Sports Club.

He played for various clubs in South Africa, France, Turkey, Vietnam and the Maldives.

He represented Ghana at the 2005 FIFA U-17 World Championship in Peru. His debut for the senior team was against Libya on 5 September 2008.

Honours 
2007–08: Telkom Knockout winner
2008–09: MTN8 winner

References

External links
 
 

1988 births
Living people
Ghanaian footballers
Association football defenders
Ghana international footballers
Liberty Professionals F.C. players
Footballers from Accra
Kaizer Chiefs F.C. players
Ashanti Gold SC players
Heart of Lions F.C. players
International Allies F.C. players
Samsunspor footballers
Süper Lig players
Ghanaian expatriate footballers
Ghanaian expatriate sportspeople in South Africa
Ghanaian expatriate sportspeople in Turkey
Expatriate footballers in Turkey
New Radiant S.C. players